This is a list of college athletics programs in the U.S. state of New Mexico.

NCAA

Division I

Division II

NAIA

NJCAA

USCAA

See also 
List of NCAA Division I institutions
List of NCAA Division II institutions
List of NCAA Division III institutions
List of NAIA institutions
List of USCAA institutions
List of NCCAA institutions

New Mexico
College athletic programs
College sports in New Mexico
College athletic programs